Serpulina alvinipulli is a bacterium that is enteropathogenic for chickens. It is an anaerobic spirochaete with type strain C1T (= ATCC 51933T).

References

Further reading

Dworkin, Martin, and Stanley Falkow, eds. The Prokaryotes: Vol. 7: Proteobacteria: Delta and Epsilon Subclasses. Vol. 6. Springer, 2006.
Biđin, Zdenko, and Z. Bidin. Diseases of poultry. Veterinarski Fakultet Sveučilišta u Zagrebu (Faculty of Veterinary Medicine, University of Zagreb), 2008.

External links
LPSN

Spirochaetes
Bacteria described in 1998